Croydon City Arrows is an Australian soccer club based in Croydon, Victoria, currently playing in the 5th tier of the Victorian association football structure and the seventh tier nationally. The club was established 1957 and has won two Victorian titles, in 1985 and 1986, and plays at the Dorset Recreational Reserve. The club was briefly known as Maroondah Arrows in 1997 and 1998.

Croydon City Arrows senior men's team currently participates in the Victorian State League Division 4 East. 

Croydon City Arrows senior women's team currently participates in the Victorian State League Division 1 South-East.

Notable former players
 Daniel Allsopp – Former Socceroo
 Jimmy Rooney – 1974 World Cup Socceroo
 Peter Ollerton – 1974 World Cup Socceroo
 Paul Wade –  Former Socceroo Captain '86-96
Marcus Stergiopoulos - South Melbourne, Lincoln City FC, and Bradford City

References

 Croydon City Divisional History

External links
Official Website of Croydon City Arrows
Croydon City Arrows divisional history

Soccer clubs in Melbourne
Victorian State League teams
Association football clubs established in 1957
1957 establishments in Australia
Italian-Australian backed sports clubs of Victoria
Sport in the City of Maroondah